Sandsjøen is a lake in the municipality of Lierne in Trøndelag county, Norway. The village of Holand is located on the northern shore of Sandsjøen.

The lake, near the Swedish border, is the beginning of the Sanddøla river, a main tributary of the river Namsen.  The lake flows out into the lake Laksjøen to the west.

See also
List of lakes in Norway

References

Lierne
Lakes of Trøndelag